Michael Stember (born January 30, 1978) is a track and field athlete from the United States who is known for his achievements in the middle distance events. His first international competition was winning the gold medal in the 1500 metres at the 1997 Pan American Junior Championships. He won a silver medal at the 1999 Pan American Games in the men's 1500 metres. He ran in the 2000 Summer Olympics in Sydney, Australia, where he qualified for the semi-finals but finished a non-qualifying 9th. He returned to the 2003 Pan American Games and repeated his silver medal in the men's 1500 metres. In 2004 he became the U.S. Indoor 800 m champion. In 2007–2008 he was a volunteer coach at UCLA. He later became a restaurant owner.

Running career

High school

Stember ran for Jesuit High School. As a sophomore in 1994 at the CIF California State Meet he finished second in the 1600 metres to the future American marathon great Meb Keflezighi. He won the race outright as a junior (1995) and senior (1996). His 4:04.00 winning time in the 1995 CIF State Meet was the state 1600 meters record until 2001 when it was surpassed by Ryan Hall at 4:02:62. The impressive finish—starting after two laps—is depicted in a YouTube video named "Godspeed" which has been clicked more than 25 million times since its release in 2010. However, as fast as Stember was running, he had a habit of running strategically, always finishing with a devastating kick that demoralized his opponents.  As a junior, it worked well because no athlete on that level could match his kick at any pace.

Collegiate
He carried this strategy to Stanford University, even though Vin Lananna tried to coax him into occasionally using other strategies.  He scored 13 points for the team in 2000, with a second place in the 1500 and 4th place in the 800 metres as Stanford won the NCAA Men's Outdoor Track and Field Championship. Stember holds the Stanford records in both the 1500 metres and 800 metres and was named All American ten times.  He ran the 800 metre leg on Stanford's "world record" claiming team for the unsanctioned Indoor "Distance Medley Relay".

International
In 1999, he was fourth in the World University Games, behind then-Kenyan Bernard Lagat. A year later, he was the third qualifier at the U.S. Olympic Trials, but had not achieved the A Standard. He spent the summer chasing the mark, achieving it at Herculis in one of the last opportunities before the Olympics. Stember ended up running the men's 1500 meters at the 2000 Summer Olympics, but did not make it to the final round.

References

External links
 Michael Stember at USA Track & Field
 
 

1978 births
Living people
American male middle-distance runners
Athletes (track and field) at the 2000 Summer Olympics
Athletes (track and field) at the 1999 Pan American Games
Athletes (track and field) at the 2003 Pan American Games
Olympic track and field athletes of the United States
Track and field athletes from Sacramento, California
Stanford Cardinal men's track and field athletes
Pan American Games silver medalists for the United States
People from Fair Oaks, California
Pan American Games medalists in athletics (track and field)
Medalists at the 1999 Pan American Games
Medalists at the 2003 Pan American Games